The French overseas collectivities (collectivité d'outre-mer or COM) are first-order administrative divisions of France, like the French regions, but have a semi-autonomous status. The COMs include some former French overseas colonies and other French overseas entities with a particular status, all of which became COMs by constitutional reform on 28 March 2003. The COMs differ from overseas regions and overseas departments, which have the same status as metropolitan France but are located outside Europe.
As integral parts of France, overseas collectivities are represented in the National Assembly, Senate and Economic and Social Council. Though some are outside the European Union, all can vote to elect members of the European Parliament (MEPs). (All of France became one multi-member EU constituency in 2019.) The Pacific COMs use the CFP franc, a currency pegged to the euro, whereas the Atlantic COMs use the euro itself. 
As of 31 March 2011, there were five COMs:

 French Polynesia became a COM in 2003. Its statutory law of 27 February 2004 gives it the designation of overseas country inside the Republic (or POM), but without legal modification of its status. French Polynesia has a great degree of autonomy, two symbolic manifestations of which are the title of the President of French Polynesia (Le président de la Polynésie française) and its additional designation as a pays d'outre-mer. Legislature: Assembly of French Polynesia since 2004.
 Saint Barthélemy, an island in the Lesser Antilles. St. Barthelemy was separated from the overseas department of Guadeloupe in 2007. It has a territorial council and executive council, and with separation ceased to be part of the  European Union.
 Saint Martin, the northern part of the island of Saint Martin in the Lesser Antilles. St. Martin was separated from the overseas department of Guadeloupe in 2007. It has a territorial council and executive council, and with separation remained a part of the European Union.
 Saint Pierre and Miquelon, a group of islands in the Atlantic Ocean off the coast of Newfoundland, Canada. It has a territorial council. It is the last remaining part of New France to be under French rule.
 Wallis and Futuna, three small islands in the Pacific Ocean has a high administrator and territorial assembly.

Former COMs and overseas territories
 Mayotte was a COM from 1976 until 31 March 2011, when it became an overseas department.
 New Caledonia was classified as an overseas territory beginning in 1946, but as a result of the 1998 Nouméa Accord, it gained a special status (statut particulier or statut original) in 1999. A New Caledonian citizenship was established, and a gradual transfer of power from the French state to New Caledonia itself was begun, to last from fifteen to twenty years.

Table of overseas collectivities and sui generis collectivity

See also 
 2009 Mahoran status referendum
 Administrative divisions of France
 Overseas country of France (Outre-mer)
 Overseas departments and regions of France
 Overseas France
 Overseas Territories of France (European Parliament constituency)
 Overseas territory
 Special member state territories and the European Union

References

External links 
 COM – Overseas communities at the far ends of the world – Official French website 
 Official website 
 Past and current developments of France's overseas administrative divisions like collectivités d'outre-mer